DXWK (101.5 FM), broadcasting as 101.5 Love Radio, is a radio station owned and operated by Manila Broadcasting Company. Its studios and transmitter are located at the 3rd floor, RD Plaza Bldg., Pendatun Ave., Brgy. Dadiangas West, General Santos.

References

Radio stations in General Santos
Radio stations established in 1990
Love Radio Network stations